Durjan Singh was a great leader of Chuar rebellion of Bengal. Singh was a zamindar of Raipur in Bengal. He led the Chuar rebellion in 1798-99 in Midnapore district against the British East India Company.

Rebellion 
In Bengal, the Bhumijs Kudmis, bauris  of Jungle Mahals were called chuars (meaning pig). Some of them became zamindars, and called themselves Rajas or Sardars. Their rebellions during the British rule were called Chuar rebellion.

Raja Durjan Singh was the Bhumij zamindar of Raipur, from where he was dispossessed by the British. To get back his Raipur estate, Durjan Singh joined the Chuar rebellion started by Jagannath Singh, zamindar of Dhalbhum and attacked the British with around 15,000 of his companions and caused havoc in Raipur and surrounding areas. He was also supported by other dispossessed Bhumij zamindars, Rajas and Bagri leaders of Midnapore, Dhalbhum, Bankura including Jagannath Singh, Mohan Singh, Subal Singh, Shyam Ganjam Singh, Rani Shiromani, Lal Singh, Baidyanath Singh, Raghunath Singh, Mangal Singh, Lakshman Singh, Achal Singh, Govardhan Dhikpati etc. He established his rule over 30 villages and attacked the East India Company establishments. The Chuars (Bhumijs) spread  the rebellion in Raipur, Bankura, Phulkusma, Bhalaidiha, Shyamsunderpur and Simlapal.

The Chuar Mutiny, led by Durjan Singh, was at its peak in 1798-99, but was brutally crushed by the Company's army.

References 

Bengal Presidency
History of Jharkhand
Tribal chiefs
Indian revolutionaries
Adivasi
Bhumij people
Indian independence activists from West Bengal